Battle at Bloody Beach, (aka Battle on the Beach in the UK and Australia), is a 1961 drama directed by Herbert Coleman and starring Audie Murphy who had previously worked together in Posse from Hell. The film also features Gary Crosby and introduces Alejandro Rey. Battle at Bloody Beach is only the second Audie Murphy movie set in World War II, after his autobiographical To Hell and Back. The film was shot on Santa Catalina Island by Robert Lippert's Associated Producers Incorporated and was released by 20th Century Fox.  The film was produced and co-written by Richard Maibaum along with frequent Audie Murphy collaborator Willard W. Willingham.

Plot
Craig Benson (Audie Murphy) is a civilian working for the Navy helping arm and supply guerrilla insurgents in the Philippines. His main purpose, however, is to find his wife Ruth (Dolores Michaels), from whom he was separated by the Japanese invasion of the Philippines.

Coming ashore Benson kills two Japanese soldiers who have ambushed his contact Sgt. Marty Sackler (Gary Crosby). The two initially meet a band of dubious guerrillas who act as bandits led by a renegade American M'Keever (William Mims) who desires the weapons Benson brought but concealed. Realising M'Keever is a dead loss, the two fight but actual guerrillas led by Julio Fontana (Alejandro Rey) and an American boxer trapped in the Philippines Tiger Blair (Ivan Dixon) defeat M'Keever's bandits and kill him.

Benson agrees to arm Fontana's guerrilla band and meets a group of American civilians he will evacuate to Australia including his wife Ruth (Dolores Michaels) who believed him killed and is romantically involved with Fontana.

Cast
 Audie Murphy as Craig Benson
 Gary Crosby as Marty Sackler
 Dolores Michaels as Ruth Benson
 Alejandro Rey as Julio Fontana
 Marjorie Stapp as Caroline Pelham
 Barry Atwater as Pelham
 E. J. André as Dr. Van Bart
 Dale Ishimoto as Blanco
 Lillian Bronson as Delia Ellis
 Míriam Colón as Nahni
 Pilar Seurat as Camota
 William Mims as M'Keever
 Ivan Dixon as Tiger Blair
 Sara Anderson as Mrs. Thompson
 Kevin Brodie as Timmy Thompson
 Lloyd Kino as Japanese lieutenant

See also
 List of American films of 1961

References

External links 
 
 
 
 
Review of film at Cinema Retro

1961 films
20th Century Fox films
CinemaScope films
American war drama films
Audie Murphy
Films set in the Philippines
Pacific War films
American black-and-white films
1960s English-language films
Films with screenplays by Richard Maibaum
1960s war drama films
1961 drama films
1960s American films